Hoang Anh Gia Lai – Arsenal JMG Academy was a football academy in Pleiku, Gia Lai Province, Tây Nguyên of Vietnam. The academy was a built as co-operation between Arsenal Football Club, JMG Academy and the Vietnamese privately owned Hoang Anh Gia Lai Corporation. This football academy was the first one in Vietnam so far. It was also a feeder club to Hoang Anh Gia Lai in the V-League.

Background 
Despite football is the number one sport in Vietnam, the country has just won a few cups in Association of Southeast Asian Nations (ASEAN) football tournaments with the most recent one being the 2008 AFF Championship as Thailand is still the dominating team in the region. The causes of low success rate of Vietnam’s football team are always the lack of systematic training with the academy are being formed for the purposes to improve Vietnamese football talents. In August 2009, two players from the academy were sent to train with the Arsenal first team.

References

External links 
 
 Pleiku - Vietnam - JMG Football

Hoang Anh Gia Lai FC
Pleiku
Football academies in Vietnam